Jeremy Joseph Vuolo (born September 5, 1987) is a former American soccer player for Major League Soccer and the North American Soccer League. After marrying Jinger Duggar (one of the 19 Duggar children of 19 Kids and Counting), he appeared on the spinoff series Counting On.

Early life and education 
Vuolo was born in Philadelphia, Pennsylvania, to Chuck and Diana Vuolo. He was homeschooled throughout his school years, except for his senior year, when he attended Downingtown West High School. He graduated from Hartwick College in 2010 with a degree in Business Administration.

Soccer career
Vuolo began playing college soccer in 2006 at Hartwick College before transferring to Syracuse University in 2010 to complete his senior year. Before and during college, Vuolo also appeared for PDL club Reading United between 2005 and 2010.

After college, Vuolo signed with Finnish club AC Oulu and appeared in 24 games for the team, recording 11 cleansheets. Vuolo returned to the United States when he signed with the club New York Red Bulls of Major League Soccer in 2012.

After his release from New York, Vuolo briefly stepped away from the game to concentrate on full-time ministry, but announced in April 2013 that he had signed with NASL club San Antonio Scorpions.

Personal life
Vuolo married reality-TV personality Jinger Duggar in 2016. They have two children, Felicity and Evangeline. He is a Christian.

References

External links

Syracuse bio

1987 births
Living people
American soccer players
American expatriate soccer players
American people of Italian descent
Syracuse Orange men's soccer players
Reading United A.C. players
AC Oulu players
San Antonio Scorpions players
Association football midfielders
Soccer players from Pennsylvania
Expatriate footballers in Finland
USL League Two players
North American Soccer League players
Duggar family
American theologians
People from Downingtown, Pennsylvania
Hartwick Hawks men's soccer players
American expatriate sportspeople in Finland
New York Red Bulls players
Sportspeople from Chester County, Pennsylvania